Crime, Media, Culture  is a peer-reviewed academic journal covering work at the intersections of criminological and cultural inquiry. It promotes a broad cross-disciplinary understanding of the relationship between crime, criminal justice, media and culture. The journal explores a range of media forms (including traditional media, new and alternative media, and surveillance technologies) and has a special focus on cultural criminology and its concerns with image, representation, meaning and style.

The journal covers three broad substantive areas:
The relationship between crime, criminal justice and media forms (including traditional media, new and alternative media, and surveillance technologies)
The relationship between criminal justice and cultural dynamics (with a special focus on cultural criminology and its concerns with image, representation, meaning and style)
The intersections of crime, criminal justice, media forms and cultural dynamics (including historical, political, situational, spatial, subcultural and cross-cultural intersections)

Established in 2005 by Jeff Ferrell, Yvonne Jewkes, and Chris Greer, the journal is currently edited by Sarah Armstrong, Katherine Biber, and Travis Linnemann.

Previous editors-in-chief have been:
Michelle Brown (University of Tennessee-Knoxville)
Eamonn Carrabine (University of Essex)
Jeff Ferrell (Texas Christian University and University of Kent)
Chris Greer (City University London)
Mark S. Hamm (Indiana State University)
Yvonne Jewkes (University of Bath)

Abstracting and indexing
The journal is abstracted and indexed in Scopus and the Social Sciences Citation Index. According to the Journal Citation Reports, the journal has a 2020 impact factor of 2.796.

References

External links

SAGE Publishing academic journals
English-language journals
Criminology journals
Media studies journals
Triannual journals
Publications established in 2005